Ion Ioniță (born 14 July 1928) is a Romanian former cyclist. He competed at the 1952 and 1960 Summer Olympics.

References

External links
 

1928 births
Possibly living people
Romanian male cyclists
Olympic cyclists of Romania
Cyclists at the 1952 Summer Olympics
Cyclists at the 1960 Summer Olympics